Bahawalpur Zoo, established in 1942, is a  zoological garden in Bahawalpur, Punjab, Pakistan. It is managed by the Government of Pakistan.

The zoo has occasionally bred and supplied wild cats, such as Asiatic lions and Bengal tigers, to other zoos in the country. It also has an aquarium and zoological museum with stuffed birds, reptiles and mammals.

History
Bahawalpur zoo was set up in 1942 by the former Aamir of Bahawalpur, Sir Nawab Sadiq Muhammad Khan Abbasi. It was then named "Sher Bagh" (meaning "lion garden"). In 1955, the administrator of the zoo Dr.Ghulam Haider Sumra was transferred to the Department of Agriculture. From 1977 to 1982, the zoo remained under the control of the Department of the Live Stock Punjab. The Bahawalpur Zoo is the fourth biggest zoo in Pakistan, after Lahore Zoo, Karachi Zoo and Islamabad Zoo.

Exhibits
The exhibits are a mix between old style cages and newer moated enclosures. One older exhibit houses a pair of domestic cats, jackals, and an Indian civet cat. Crocodiles are kept in a large outdoor enclosure. lions, tigers, and hyenas are housed in more modern moated enclosures. A large pond in the zoo is home to pelicans, cranes, and geese. Several peafowl are also on exhibit. Blackbuck, hog deer, nilgai, European red deer, chinkara, and European mouflon are all housed in large paddocks.

The zoo also includes a museum with stuffed animals, including what is claimed to be the last lion shot in the Punjab.

Criticism
The zoo has received criticism various times for its neglect of animals often resulting in poor living conditions.

Animals

Aves
Budgerigar
Chukar partridge
Common pheasant
Demoiselle crane
Great white pelican
Greylag goose
Indian peafowl
Rock pigeon
Elephant
Rose-ringed parakeet
Silver pheasant
Western crowned pigeon
Wild turkey

Mammals
Asiatic lion
Asian black bear
Bengal tiger
Black Buck
Chinkara (Indian gazelle)
Chital (spotted deer)
Hog deer
Himalayan brown bear
Llama
Mouflon
Nilgai (blue bull)
Plains zebra
Red deer
Red-necked wallaby
Rhesus macaque
Sambar
Small Indian civet

Reptiles
Mugger crocodile
Spur-thighed tortoise

Conservation
This zoo has bred various threatened species of Asiatic lion, Asian black bear, Bengal tiger, blackbuck and hog deer. Others like chinkara (Indian gazelle), chital (spotted deer), and nilgai (blue bull) are also breeding successfully in the zoo.

See also

List of zoos in Pakistan
List of parks and gardens in Pakistan

References

Buildings and structures in Bahawalpur
Zoos in Pakistan
1942 establishments in British India
Zoos established in 1942
Tourist attractions in Bahawalpur
Bahawalpur (princely state)